Bećarac is a humorous form of folk song, originally from rural Slavonia, Croatia and eventually spreading into southern Hungary and the  Vojvodina region of Serbia. The root of the word comes from bećar, meaning "bachelor", "reveler" or "carouser". Bećarci are always teasing, mocking and/or lascivious, and are usually sung by a male company at village parties.

Description
Bećarac uses a strict form of couplet in decasyllable, always sung to the same music, played by a tamburitza orchestra or just by the choir. The first verse is sung by the choir leader and forms a logical thesis; it is repeated by the choir of gathered men. The second verse is a humorous antithesis, also repeated by the choir (but often broken by laughter). Bećarci are usually performed at the peak of a party as a drinking song after the crowd is sufficiently warmed up by wine and music. A series of bećarci can last indefinitely. The lyrics are often made up at the spot or improvised, and the best ones are spread and reused for later parties.

History
In 2009, Croatia submitted the bećarac among others for inclusion in the UNESCO Intangible Cultural Heritage Lists. In 2010, the attempt was again unsuccessful, and English translations were made for better reference. In 2011, it was included in the list.

In 2017 it was announced that a museum dedicated to bećarac would be opening in the town of Pleternica, Croatia. The concept was described by the director as contemporary museum, which will tell the traditional heritage of bećarac, but in a modern setting. Due to  bećarac being a vital part of the intangible cultural heritage of Croatia, 85% of the museum project was funded by the European Union, with expectations of it having a positive impact on the well-being of the town and the entire region.

References

External links
UNESCO Representative List of Intangible Cultural Heritage of Humanity

Croatian folk music
Slavonia
Masterpieces of the Oral and Intangible Heritage of Humanity